Damien Marcq (born 8 December 1988) is a French professional footballer who plays for the Belgian club Charleroi. He can play in the defending position, as well as in the midfield.

Club career
Marcq spent his entire youth career at his hometown club US Boulogne which he joined in 1996. He came up through the ranks of the youth system and joined the club's first team in 2006, while they were playing in third tier Championnat National. He made his club debut during the 2006–07 Championnat National season appearing as a late match substitute in a 1–0 victory over Louhans-Cuiseaux. He would make eleven more appearances contributing to Boulogne's promotion to Ligue 2 for the 2006–07 season. Boulogne spent two seasons in Ligue 2 making 63 league appearances before earning promotion to Ligue 1 for the 2009–10 season. On 10 September 2009, Marcq signed a two-year contract extension.

On 28 June 2010, Marcq completed a transfer to newly promoted Ligue 1 club Stade Malherbe Caen having agreed to a three-year contract while Caen paid Boulogne a transfer fee of €2 million.

In June 2012, Marcq joined CS Sedan Ardennes on loan.

With his three-year contract with Caen expiring, Marcq signed a two-year contract with the Belgian Pro League side Sporting Charleroi in June 2013.

On 7 July 2021, he joined Union SG on a one-year contract with an optional second year.

On 14 July 2022, Marcq returned to Charleroi on a one-year contract.

International career
On 25 May 2009, Marcq was called up, for the first time, to the France under-21 team that participated in the Toulon Tournament. He made his under-21 debut in the tournament in the squad's final group stage match against Chile.

References

External links
 LFP Profile
 
 
 

Living people
1988 births
People from Boulogne-sur-Mer
Sportspeople from Pas-de-Calais
Association football midfielders
French footballers
France under-21 international footballers
Ligue 1 players
Ligue 2 players
Championnat National 2 players
Championnat National 3 players
Belgian Pro League players
US Boulogne players
Stade Malherbe Caen players
Dijon FCO players
CS Sedan Ardennes players
K.A.A. Gent players
R. Charleroi S.C. players
S.V. Zulte Waregem players
Royale Union Saint-Gilloise players
French expatriate footballers
Expatriate footballers in Belgium
French expatriate sportspeople in Belgium
Footballers from Hauts-de-France